The Kuala Selangor District is a district in Selangor, Malaysia. It has a total landmass of 1,194.52 square kilometres (461 sq mi) separated by Selangor River into two division, Tanjung Karang and Kuala Selangor. The district boundary is shared with Sabak Bernam at the north, Hulu Selangor and Gombak at the west, Petaling at the southwest and Klang at the south.

Geography
The geography of Kuala Selangor is characterised by a flat land in Tanjung Karang and Jeram. Bordered in Kapar in South and some hills at Southeast. The district's name was from a town that named when Selangor River meets the sea.

Administrative divisions

Kuala Selangor District is divided into 9 mukims, which are:
 Api-Api
 Bestari Jaya
 Hujong Permatang
 Hulu Tinggi
 Ijok
 Jeram
 Kuala Selangor
 Pasangan
 Tanjung Karang

Demographics

Federal Parliament and State Assembly Seats

List of Kuala Selangor district representatives in the Federal Parliament (Dewan Rakyat)

List of Kuala Selangor district representatives in the State Legislative Assembly (Dewan Undangan Negeri)

The Kuala Selangor District Council is seeking for the area to become declared as a municipality.

Transportation

Road construction
Currently there is an expressway named Kuala Lumpur–Kuala Selangor Expressway E25 (LATAR) linked Ijok, Kuala Selangor and Templer Park, Rawang. It is also connected with Guthrie Corridor Expressway (GCE) to Shah Alam and North–South Expressway Central Link to northern Peninsular Malaysia. Another expressway which is under construction named West Coast Expressway (WCE) in Tanjung Karang only have small amount of them which only provided in the township of Tanjung Karang and some sub-roads in some villages. The town is usually accessed via Klang–Teluk Intan Road FT5 (coastal route), Kuala Selangor–Kepong Road FT54 (to Kuala Lumpur) and Kuala Selangor–Bestari Jaya Road B33 (to Bestari Jaya & Rawang).

Public Transport
There are 6 bus lines by Selangor Omnibus, Wawasan Sutera and rapidKL bus currently serving the Kuala Selangor District which is:
100 (Kuala Selangor to Kuala Lumpur via Ijok)
105 (Kuala Selangor to Bestari Jaya)
107 (Bestari Jaya to Kuala Lumpur via Ijok)
740 (Kuala Selangor to Klang)
753 (Shah Alam to UiTM Puncak Alam via Klang)
T715 (UiTM Puncak Alam to Puncak Alam)

Two free bus services provided by MDKS (Kuala Selangor District Council) are available:
KS01 (Kuala Selangor to Sekinchan via Tanjong Karang)
KS02 (Puncak Alam to Sungai Buloh railway station)

Taxi services and Grab Car also available in the Kuala Selangor town.

The Local Planning Masterplan for the year 2015 released by MDKS envision the addition of a Light Rail Transit facility (linking Bestari Jaya, Puncak Alam and Shah Alam) in the future.

Schools

See also

 Districts of Malaysia

References